Christopher Corchiani Sr. (born March 28, 1968) is an American-Italian former professional basketball player.url=https://web.archive.org/web/20101122193101/http://www.acb.com/jugador.php?id=AYK |archive-date=2010-11-22 |url-status=dead }}</ref> and a weight of 88 kg (195 lbs.), he played at the point guard position.

High school
Born in Coral Gables, Florida, Corchiani attended Miami's Kendall Acres Academy, and Hialeah-Miami Lakes High School, in Hialeah, Florida.

College career
Corchiani's college basketball career lasted from 1988 to 1991, at North Carolina State University, where he played with the NC State Wolfpack. Corchiani was the first NCAA Division I player to record 1,000 assists in a career. In the 1990–91 season, he led the nation in assists per game average, at 9.7 per game. At the time he finished his career, he was in 5th place on the NCAA's all-time steals list.

Professional career
Corchiani was selected by the Orlando Magic, with the 9th pick of the 2nd round (36th overall), of the 1991 NBA draft. In addition to the Magic, he played with two other NBA teams, the Boston Celtics and the Washington Bullets. He also played professionally in Italy, Turkey, Spain, and Germany. He was a member of the Bayer Leverkusen team, which captured the German Bundesliga title in 1996 under the guidance of coach Dirk Bauermann. In 2002, he won the Spanish national championship with Tau Cerámica, alongside players like Elmer Bennett, Luis Scola and Andrés Nocioni, coached by Duško Ivanović.

After retiring from basketball, he settled in Raleigh, North Carolina, working as a realtor, then as the owner of a mortgage bank. In 2007, he founded a title insurance agency.

See also
 List of NCAA Division I men's basketball players with 20 or more assists in a game
 List of NCAA Division I men's basketball career assists leaders
 List of NCAA Division I men's basketball season assists leaders
 List of NCAA Division I men's basketball career steals leaders

References

External links 
 College & NBA stats @ basketball-reference.com
 What the Hell Happened to...Chris Corchiani? @ celticslife.com
 Euroleague.net Profile
 Italian League Profile 
 Spanish League Profile 

1968 births
Living people
All-American college men's basketball players
American expatriate basketball people in Germany
American expatriate basketball people in Italy
American expatriate basketball people in Spain
American expatriate basketball people in Turkey
American men's basketball players
Anadolu Efes S.K. players
Basketball players from Florida
Basket Rimini Crabs players
Bayer Giants Leverkusen players
Boston Celtics players
CB Girona players
Italian men's basketball players
Liga ACB players
McDonald's High School All-Americans
Mens Sana Basket players
NC State Wolfpack men's basketball players
Orlando Magic draft picks
Orlando Magic players
Pallacanestro Treviso players
Parade High School All-Americans (boys' basketball)
Point guards
Rapid City Thrillers players
Saski Baskonia players
Sportspeople from Coral Gables, Florida
Washington Bullets players
United States men's national basketball team players